Famelica mirmidina is a species of sea snail, a marine gastropod mollusk in the family Raphitomidae.

Description
The length of the shell attains 7.5 mm, its diameter 2.5 mm.

The thin shell has a long spire. It contains 8 whorls. The suture is impressed. 
The subsutural band is distinguished from the rest of the surface only by the direction of the growth striae that are arched in the opposite direction. At the base of the upper whorls, there are some very short longitudinal threads. The top of the holotype is in very bad condition so we cannot see if these are the vestiges of a general sculpture of the embryonic whorl. The aperture is slightly pyriform. The wide siphonal canal is very short. The narrow columella stands almost upright and is slightly twisted at the base. It shows a very thin callus. The outer lip is thin and sharp. The shell shows a uniform white color.

Distribution
F. mirmidina can be found in waters off the western coast of Florida. Also off Guadeloupe and the Azores.

References

 Gofas, S.; Le Renard, J.; Bouchet, P. (2001). Mollusca. in: Costello, M.J. et al. (eds), European Register of Marine Species: a check-list of the marine species in Europe and a bibliography of guides to their identification. Patrimoines Naturels. 50: 180–213. 
 Sysoev A.V. (2014). Deep-sea fauna of European seas: An annotated species check-list of benthic invertebrates living deeper than 2000 m in the seas bordering Europe. Gastropoda. Invertebrate Zoology. Vol.11. No.1: 134–155
 Figueira R.M. Andrade & Absalão R.S. (2012) Deep-water Raphitomidae (Mollusca, Gastropoda, Conoidea) from the Campos Basin, southeast Brazil. Zootaxa 3527: 1–27

External links
 

mirmidina
Gastropods described in 1896